The 2017–18 Liga EBA season was the 24th season of the Spanish basketball fourth league. The season started in September 2017 and ended in May 2018 with the promotion playoffs to LEB Plata.

Overview before the season
Teams are divided in five groups attending to geographical criteria. Groups A, C and D are divided in two.

Regular season
Group A–A: Basque Country, Cantabria, Castile and León and Navarre.
Group A–B: Asturias, Galicia and Castile and León.
Group B: Community of Madrid, Castile-La Mancha and Canary Islands.
Groups C–A: Catalonia and Balearic Islands.
Groups C–B: Aragon, Catalonia and Balearic Islands.
Group D–A: Andalusia and Melilla.
Group D–B: Andalusia and Extremadura.
Group E: Valencian Community and Region of Murcia.

Promotion playoffs
The three best teams of each group and the fourth of Group D (champion of the previous season) will play the promotion playoffs. From these 16 teams, only four will be promoted to LEB Plata. The winner of each group can organize a group stage.

The promotion playoffs will be played round-robin format in groups of four teams where the first qualified of each group will host one of the stages.

Regular season

Group A

Group A–A

Group A–B

Finals

First-qualified teams playoff
The winner of this single-legged series will host one of the four groups of the final stage. The game was played on 5 May at the Pabellón de A Raña in Marín.

|}

Qualifying playoffs
The winner qualified for the final stage. The games were played on 5 and 6 May at the Palacio de Deportes of Gijón.

Group B

Group C

Group C–A

Group C–B

Finals

Final Four
The winner will host one of the four groups of the final stage. Runner-up and third place game winner qualified for the final stage. The games were played on 5 and 6 May at Pavelló Municipal d'Esports of Vic.

Relegation playoffs
Winners remained at Liga EBA. First leg was played on 5 and 6 May, second leg on 12 and 13.

|}

Group D

Regular season

Group D–A

Group D–B

Second stage

Group D–Qualification

Group D–Relegation

Group E

Regular season

Second stage

Group E–Qualification

Group E–Relegation

Promotion playoffs
The 16 qualified teams will be divided in four groups of four teams. The first qualified teams will host the groups, played with a round-robin format.

The winner of each group will promote to LEB Plata.

Group 1 – Gandia

Group 2 – Marín

Group 3 – Almansa

Group 4 – Mahón

References

External links
Liga EBA at FEB.es 

Liga EBA seasons
EBA